Goldbond is an unincorporated community in Giles County, Virginia, United States.

Goldbond is located on Stony Creek and State Route 635, 5.3 miles (8.5 km) northeast of Pearisburg. The name Goldbond derives from an earlier limestone processing works situated in the community, National Gypsum Company, which produced 'Gold Bond' gypsum wallboard. Prior to the company's presence, the area was known as Kerns, Virginia, after the Kern's Bread Company which once operated there.

Archaeological evidence collected by locals along with area history suggest the community that is now Goldbond saw military action during the American Civil War; however, no official markers note this at present.

Notable landmarks in the area include two family cemeteries (those of the Moser and Reed Families), a covered mill, a former elementary school (now a private residence), and a former local store which also served as a community U.S. Post Office until its closing on July 30, 2005. Prior to moving to a community post office format Goldbond's post office, which opened February 21, 1923, was operated on land belonging to the Reed Family. This first office was later shifted to the home of Postmasters Irene Moser (née Reed) and Tyree Moser, Sr. in whose family postal operations of the community ran for more than 60 years as noted in an extensive article in the area's newspaper, the 'Virginian Leader,' on the occasion of the couple's retirement and the office's moving in the early 90s.[1]

Notable residents 
Tyree Moser, Sr. (1921-1998) - In addition to his retirement duties as an assistant postmaster, Goldbold native and resident, Tyree Moser was also noteworthy in and around the area as a former member of the Civilian Conservation Corps in the 1930s, a combat veteran of the Second World War (landing at Utah Beach in the Normandy Campaign before participating in the Northern France Campaign and Rhineland Campaign). Moser was also recalled for military service during the late 40s/early 50s in the days leading up to the Korean War but was later discharged due to numerous family commitments. He returned to become notable as a local chairman of the Republican Party in which role Moser met with several senior politicians visiting the area including William C. Wampler and John Warner as well as Warner's then wife actress Elizabeth Taylor.

Moser's decedents including 2 of his 5 sons also served in the US Army. His eldest child (William E. Moser, Sr.) a Military Police officer, died while on active duty in the 1960s and is buried at the Moser Cemetery in Goldbond while Moser's third son (Dennis R. Moser) served as a Combat Medic in the Vietnam War receiving multiple decorations including the Purple Heart, Air Medal, Army Commendation with 'V' and Good Conduct Medal (United States) and later retired after 33 years as a Postal Carrier in Tennessee. Additionally, Moser's grandson (James Moser) serves as an active duty Air Force chaplain and uniquely received the Air Force Commander's Award for Public Service prior to joining given his years of service in the US Air Force Auxiliary Civil Air Patrol. James Moser was also named an "Citoyen d'Honnor" (or Honorary Citizen) of the town of Saint-Lô, Normandy, France in 1999 and returned to the town multiple times including in 2011 when he spoke before the mayor, military officials, and locals citizens at the Saint-Lô  after laying a wreath at the town's memorial on the anniversary of D-Day representing his grandfather and other American service personnel.

Awards and decorations
Below are military awards and insignias given to Tyree Moser which at one time were on display in Giles  but which, following his death, were returned to his family in other parts of Southwest Virginia.

References 

Unincorporated communities in Giles County, Virginia
Unincorporated communities in Virginia